Rainer Vossen (German: Rainer Voßen; born December 6, 1951 in Düsseldorf, Germany) is a German linguist and Africanist. His research interests include the historical linguistics of Nilotic languages and Khoisan languages.

Biography
From 1972 to 1982, Vossen studied African studies, ethnology, history, and prehistory at the University of Cologne. After receiving his doctorate in 1982 from the University of Cologne, he served as an academic advisor for the Chair of African Studies II at the University of Bayreuth from 1984 to 1990. After completing his habilitation in 1990, he was a lecturer at the University of Bayreuth from 1990 to 1992. In 1993, he became Professor of African Languages and Linguistics at Goethe University.

Selected publications
Selected publications by Rainer Vossen:

 The eastern Nilotes. Linguistic and historical reconstructions. Berlin 1982, .
 Towards a comparative study of the Maa dialects of Kenya and Tanzania. Hamburg 1988, .
 Patterns of language knowledge and language use in Ngamiland, Botswana. Bayreuth 1988, .
 Die Khoe-Sprachen. Ein Beitrag zur Erforschung der Sprachgeschichte Afrikas. Köln 1997, .

References

External links
Official faculty page

Living people
1951 births
Linguists from Germany
Academic staff of Goethe University Frankfurt
University of Cologne alumni
Linguists of Nilotic languages
People from Düsseldorf